HMS Spenser was a Thornycroft type flotilla leader of the British Royal Navy. She was built by J I Thornycroft from 1916 to 1917 as the lead ship of her class, launching in September 1917 and completing in December that year.

Spenser served in the Harwich Force during the rest of the First World War and in the Baltic during the British intervention in the Russian Civil War in 1919. After service at home and in the Mediterranean, she went into reserve in 1925 and was sold for scrap in 1936.

Design and construction
The Thornycroft type or Shakespeare-class leaders, were like the similar and contemporary Admiralty type (also known as the Scott class) were designed to meet a requirement from Admiral Sir John Jellicoe, commander of the Grand Fleet, for a large, fast and heavily armed flotilla leader to match and outclass rumoured large German destroyers.

Design displacement was  normal and  full load.

The class had a main gun armament consisted of five 4.7 in (120 mm)/45 calibre BL Mark I guns, on CP VI mountings capable of elevating to 30 degrees, arranged in two superfiring pairs fore and aft of the superstructure with the remaining gun positioned on a platform between the funnels. Shakespeares anti-aircraft armament consisted of a single  gun on a platform abaft the rear funnel. Torpedo armament consisted of two triple mounts for 21-inch (533 mm) torpedo tubes between the 3-inch AA gun and the rear pair of 4.7-inch guns. Four depth charges were carried.

The first two examples of Thornycroft's new large leader,  and Spenser, were ordered in April 1916. A third was ordered in April 1917 and four more in April 1918. Spenser, named for the poet Edmund Spenser, author of The Faerie Queene, was laid down on 9 October 1917, was launched on 22 September 1917 and commissioned on 12 December that year.

Service

Spenser joined the 10th Destroyer Flotilla of the Harwich Force on 15 December 1917 as the second in command of four leaders. On 26 January 1918, Spenser collided with a sailing ship, rescuing eight of the sailing ship's crew. On 27 February 1918, Spenser was attacked by a German Zeppelin in the southern part of the North Sea. On 1 August 1918, the Harwich Force took part in an operation against German minesweeping forces. The force would tow six Coastal Motor Boats (CMBs) to the edge of the mined areas in the inner German Bight. From there, the CMBs would proceed over the minefields and search for German minesweepers, which they were to attack with torpedoes. The operation was aborted when they were sighted by a Zeppelin, which dropped bombs that near missed several ships, with Spenser being one of the ships attacked. The operation was repeated on 10–11 August, with Spenser again part of the escort. Air cover was to be provided by flying boats carried on lighters towed behind three of the destroyers, while two more destroyers towed lighters carrying Sopwith Camel fighter aircraft, for use against German Zeppelin airships. When the force reached the minefields, the lack of wind meant that the flying boats could not take off, so the CMBs continued on unescorted, and were subject to sustained attacks by German aircraft, which resulted in three of the CMBs being sunk and the other three being interned in the Netherlands. Meanwhile, the Harwich Force, waiting for the CMBs to return, encountered the German airship L53, and a Camel took off from a lighter towed behind the destroyer  and shot down L53. Spencer remained a member of the 10th Flotilla at the end of the war on 11 November 1918.

On 21 November and 1 December 1918, Spenser escorted German U-Boats to Harwich so they could surrender. The Royal Navy's destroyer forces were reorganised after the end of the war, with Spenser becoming one of two leaders of the newly established 2nd Destroyer Flotilla, based at Rosyth, and serving as flagship for the Flotilla's Captain (D), in March 1919. In August 1919, the 2nd Destroyer Flotilla, led by Spenser, was deployed to the Baltic Sea as part of the British operations in the Baltic during the Russian Civil War, relieving the 1st Destroyer Flotilla. On the night of 17/18 August, the 2nd Flotilla, including Spenser escorted seven CMBs ona raid on the Red Fleet anchorage at Kronstadt. The CMBs sank the submarine depot ship  and damaged the battleship  at the cost of three CMBs sunk. Regular duties of the 2nd Flotilla and Spenser included patrols and shore bombardment against Bolshevik forces. Despite the support from the Royal Navy, the Bolsheviks kept control of the fort and the Estonian offensive was stopped. This deployment ended in November 1919, with the flotilla returning to British waters.

Spenser was again deployed to the Baltic in June 1920 and in September–October 1921, but by this time hostilities between Britain and the Bolshevik forces had ended. Spenser took part in a Fleet Review at Spithead of the Atlantic Fleet by Dominion leaders on 3 November 1923, and in the Fleet Review by King George V on 26 July 1924. In September 1924, Spenser joined the 3rd Destroyer Flotilla of the Mediterranean Fleet, where she served until May 1925.

Spenser entered reserve at Portsmouth on 6 June 1925. In 1927–1928, as an economy measure, reserve destroyers were transferred to a centralised Maintenance Reserve, with most reserve destroyers having no crews assigned and only undergoing essential repair work. In fact, however, the resources (both manpower and financial) allocated to the uptake of reserve destroyers was inadequate, and their condition deteriorated, so that most of them never returned to active service. Spenser moved from Portsmouth to Chatham in September 1927, remaining in reserve, and from Chatham to Rosyth in April 1933. On 19 August 1936 Spenser was one of a number of old warships transferred to the shipbreaker Thos. W. Ward in exchange for the old ocean liner , which the Royal Navy wanted as a training ship. Spenser left Rosyth on 30 September that year for scrapping at Inverkeithing.

Pennant numbers

Notes

Citations

References
 
 
 
 
 
 
 
 
 
 
 
 

 

Thornycroft type destroyer leaders
1917 ships
Ships built in Southampton
Ships built by John I. Thornycroft & Company